

The 1929 Stanford football team represented Stanford University in the 1929 college football season. In head coach Pop Warner's sixth season, Stanford finished second in the Pacific Coast Conference, losing just one conference game to eventual champion USC. The team played its home games at Stanford Stadium in Stanford, California.

Schedule

References

Stanford
Stanford Cardinal football seasons
Stanford football